And when I die, I won't stay dead is a documentary film about the life and work of African-American poet Bob Kaufman, directed by Billy Woodberry which was shown at International Film Festival Rotterdam in 2015, opened MoMa's Doc Fortnight in 2016 and won the award for Best Investigative Documentary at Doclisboa International Film Festival in 2015.

Synopsis 
A journey into the life and work of beat poet and activist Bob Kaufman and his insistence that poetry is fundamental to humanity's moral survival.

Screenings 
 Doclisboa, 2015
 Vienna International Film Festival, 2015 
 International Film Festival Rotterdam, 2016 
 MoMa's Doc Fortnight, New York 2016 
 San Francisco International Film Festival, 2016
 Harvard Film Archive, 2016

Reviews 
Ernst Hardy wrote at the Crave Online that " Woodberry's fully fleshed out depiction of the larger cultural, social and political canvases against which Kaufman lived and railed." Neil Young from the Hollywood Reporter called the film a "Conscientious tribute to a wayward soul."

References 

American documentary films
Beat poetry